Louis Lucien Mérignac (5 October 1873 in Paris – 28 February 1941 in Paris) was a French fencer who competed in the late 19th century and early 20th century. He participated in Fencing at the 1900 Summer Olympics in Paris and won the gold medal in the masters foil, defeating fellow French fencer Alphonse Kirchhoffer in the final.

His aunt was the sculptor and medallist Ernesta Robert-Mérignac (1849–1933), who was an entrant in the 1924 Summer Olympics art competition.

References

External links
 

1873 births
1941 deaths
Fencers from Paris
French male foil fencers
Olympic gold medalists for France
Olympic fencers of France
Fencers at the 1900 Summer Olympics
Olympic medalists in fencing
Medalists at the 1900 Summer Olympics
20th-century French people